The 1974-75 I-Divisioona season was the first season of the I-Divisioona, the second level of Finnish ice hockey. Eight teams participated in the league, and Vaasan Sport won the championship.

Regular season

External links
 Season on hockeyarchives.info

I-Divisioona seasons
2
Fin